Jane's All the World's Aircraft (now stylized Janes) is an aviation annual publication founded by John Frederick Thomas Jane in 1909. Long issued by Sampson Low, Marston in Britain (with various publishers in the U.S.), it has been published by Janes Information Services since 1989/90. 

The first volume's title referred to "airships" while all since have referenced "aircraft". After World War I, the format of the book shifted from an oblong ("landscape") format to the present "portrait" orientation. With the 1993/94 edition, the book was divided into two volumes that continue to appear annually. The main volume focuses on aircraft in production while the second book describes older aircraft and upgrades, both military and civil. While 2009 was the centennial year of Jane's All the World's Aircraft, 2013 marked the 100th edition—the disparity due to disruptions (chiefly with volumes covering two years) during the two World Wars. Starting in 1969, Arco (New York) issued the following six volumes in facsimile editions: 1909, 1913, 1919, 1938, 1944-45, and 1950-51.

Editors
 Fred T. Jane (founding editor), 1909–1915 
 C. G. Grey, 1916–1936
 C. G. Grey with Leonard Bridgeman, 1937 
 Leonard Bridgman, 1938–1958 
 John W. R. Taylor, 1959–1990 
 Mark Lambert, 1991–1994 
 Paul Jackson, 1995–2019
 John Sneller, 2020–present

Works

References

 Brooks, Richard.  Fred T. Jane: An Eccentric Visionary. Coulsdon, Surrey: Jane's Information Group, 1997.

External links

Aviation books
Publications established in 1909